The following are lists of current National Football League (NFL) team rosters:
For American Football Conference (AFC) rosters please see List of current AFC team rosters.
For National Football Conference (NFC) rosters please see List of current NFC team rosters.

Lists of sports lists
National Football League
Lists of players by National Football League team